Battle of Loyew, (July 6, 1651) was a battle of the Khmelnytsky Uprising. Polish–Lithuanian Commonwealth forces under the command of Janusz Radziwiłł defeated the Cossack forces under the command of Martyn Nebaba.

References
Marcin Domagała: Biała Cerkiew 23-25 IX 1651. Zabrze: "Inforteditions", 2007. .
Władysław Andrzej Serczyk: Na płonącej Ukrainie. Dzieje Kozaczyzny 1648–1651. Warszawa: Książka i Wiedza, 1998, p. 347. .
Natalia Jakowlenko: Historia Ukrainy. Od czasów najdawniejszych do końca XVIII wieku. Lublin: Instytut Europy Środkowo-Wschodniej, 2000, p. 228. .
Tadeusz Korzon: Dzieje wojen i wojskowości w Polsce. Lwów: Ossolineum, 1923, p. 339.

Conflicts in 1651
1651 in Europe
Loyew (1651)
Gomel Region